Neil Lyster (born 2 December 1947) is a road and track cyclist from New Zealand.

He competed in two Olympic Games, 1968, 1972 and was team manager during one Olympic Games 1976.

He competed in  the 1978 Commonwealth Games, where he was the flagbearer at the opening ceremony, and won a silver in the 4000m Men's Team Pursuit.

External links
 

1947 births
Living people
New Zealand male cyclists
Cyclists at the 1968 Summer Olympics
Cyclists at the 1972 Summer Olympics
Cyclists at the 1978 Commonwealth Games
Commonwealth Games silver medallists for New Zealand
Olympic cyclists of New Zealand
Sportspeople from Wellington City
Commonwealth Games medallists in cycling
20th-century New Zealand people
Medallists at the 1978 Commonwealth Games